Henry Golding (died 1593)  was an English politician from Gray's Inn, London.

He was a Member of the Parliament of England for Callington in 1589.

References

Year of birth missing
1593 deaths
Members of Gray's Inn
English MPs 1589
Members of the Parliament of England for Callington